Kris Kelmi (born Anatoli Arievich Kelmi, ; 21 April 1955 – 1 January 2019) was a Soviet and Russian rock and pop musician and composer. Some of his most well-known songs are Night Rendezvous, Closing the Ring, and Tired Taxi. Most online sources indicated that Kelmi was a pseudonym, and the musician's surname was Kalinkin. Kelmi denied this version. Kelmi believed that he most likely was Lithuanian on his father's side, explaining that there is a town in Lithuania called Kelmė, which is consonant with his last name. Kris took the nickname in 1972, after Dr. Kris Kelvin, the hero of Stanisław Lem's novel, Solaris.

Kris Kelmi died on the evening of 1 January 2019 at his Moscow Oblast home from cardiac arrest caused by alcohol abuse.

References

External links

 Official website
 
 Крис Кельми (Рок-Ателье) —  Ночное рандеву (1989)
 «Замыкая круг»
 «Верю я. Крис Кельми»

1955 births
2019 deaths
Singers from Moscow
Soviet male singers
Soviet male composers
Russian male composers
Russian keyboardists
Russian rock singers
Russian rock guitarists
Gnessin State Musical College alumni
20th-century Russian male singers
20th-century Russian singers
Russian male guitarists